Barnstable may refer to:

Places

United States 
Barnstable, Massachusetts, a town
Barnstable (village), Massachusetts, a village within the town of Barnstable
Barnstable County, Massachusetts, a county that contains the town of Barnstable, and that is roughly coterminous with Cape Cod
Barnstable Municipal Airport, on Cape Cod
Barnstable Railroad Station in the town of Barnstable, Massachusetts

England 
Barnstable, an obsolete spelling of Barnstaple, a town in Devon
Barnstable Hundred, sometimes used for Barstable Hundred, an ancient subdivision of the county of Essex

Other uses
Barnstable (film), a 1963 Australian TV play
Dale Barnstable (1925–2019), American basketball player

See also 
The Barnstable twins, actresses Patricia and Cybil Barnstable, who portrayed the Doublemint Twins in the 1970s
Barnstable Bay (disambiguation)
Barnstaple (disambiguation)
Bastable (disambiguation)